Tusks is the stage name of Emily Underhill, an English singer and electronic musician from London.

Underhill first released the Snow EP under her own name in 2012, and took the name Tusks upon releasing the Ink EP in 2014. In 2016, she signed with the label One Little Indian and issued the four-song False EP, three of whose songs would later be included on her debut full-length album. She issued that full-length on One Little Indian in October 2017, entitled Dissolve. Underhill co-produced the album alongside Brett Cox. The album drew comparisons to London Grammar, The XX, and James Blake.

Discography
Snow EP (2012)
Ink EP (2014)
False EP (2016)
Dissolve (One Little Indian, 2017)
Avalanche (One Little Indian, 2019)
Change (One Little Indian, 2021)

References

English electronic musicians
English women singers
English pop singers
Musicians from London